Pink Elephant Magic is an album by American pianist Joanne Brackeen recorded in 1998 and released on the Arkadia Jazz label.

Reception 

AllMusic reviewer Scott Yanow stated "Joanne Brackeen's 22nd recording as a leader, this CD is one of her best overall recordings due to the high-quality material, the unpredictable arrangements, the variety, and the exciting and inventive solos by the pianist and her sidemen ... The music is quite unpredictable but joyful and ultimately logical. Highly recommended". On All About Jazz, Glenn Astarita noted "Pink Elephant Magic is the complete package as Joanne Brackeen proves beyond a doubt her significant value to the jazz community while some of jazz’ top performers assist in carving out an album that is positively, "magical"".

Track listing 
All compositions by Joanne Brackeen except where noted.
 "Pink Elephant Magic" – 6:40
 "Ghost Butter" – 5:28
 "Wave" (Antônio Carlos Jobim) – 5:27
 "What's Your Choice, Rolls Royce?" – 5:46
 "Beethoven Meets the Millennium in Spain" – 8:10
 "Strange Meadowlark" (Dave Brubeck) – 6:46
 "Tico-Tico" (Zequinha de Abreu) – 5:15
 "In Vogue" – 8:22
 "Cram 'n Exam" – 6:21
 "Filene's" – 7:15

Personnel 
Joanne Brackeen – piano
Nicholas Payton – trumpet (tracks 1, 5 & 9)
Dave Liebman – soprano saxophone (tracks 4 & 10)
Chris Potter – tenor saxophone, soprano saxophone (tracks 1, 5, 8 & 9)
John Patitucci – bass (tracks 1–5 & 7–10)
Horacio "El Negro" Hernandez – drums (tracks 1–5 & 7–10)
Jamey Haddad – percussion (track 5)
Kurt Elling – vocals (track 4)

References 

Joanne Brackeen albums
1999 albums
Arkadia Jazz albums